Ekos or EKOS may refer to:

 Ekos Research Associates, a Canadian social and economic research company
 Ekos (comic), a comic book published by Aspen Comics
 Ekos, a fictional planet, the setting of "Patterns of Force" (Star Trek: The Original Series)

See also 
 Eko (disambiguation)